Ricci Judson Luyties (born May 14, 1962 in Pacific Palisades, California) is a former American volleyball player. He played on the UCLA men's volleyball team and was also a member of the United States men's national volleyball team who received a gold medal at the 1988 Summer Olympics in Seoul, South Korea. Luyties later became a successful professional beach volleyball player and won 7 domestic titles. He is now the head women's volleyball coach at the University of California, San Diego.

High school career

Luyties attended Palisades High School from 1976 through 1980. He was the  Los Angeles’ Player of the Year. Luyties led his team to the city finals in 1979 and 1980, placing second to Westchester High School.

In the summer of 1980, Luyties joined the Junior National volleyball team and continued to play on it each summer until he joined the United States men's national volleyball team in 1985.

College career

Luyties started for the UCLA Bruins from 1981 through 1984. He helped lead UCLA Bruins to four consecutive national titles and three straight league titles. In 1982 and 1984 the Bruins had an undefeated season with the assistance of Luyties. Throughout his career UCLA won eighty-three straight home games and had an overall record of 126 matches won and 7 lost.

In 1983 and 1894 he was awarded All-American honors, was named the Volleyball Magazine’s Player of the Year, and the NCAA Tournament’s Most Outstanding Player. Luyties also received all-conference honors in 1982 through 1984. He was the first men's player to earn back-to-back Player of the Year honors in NCAA history. Luyties was inducted into the UCLA Hall of Fame in 1995  and in 1996 his jersey (11) was retired at Pauley Pavilion.

American National Team

Luyties was a member of the United States men's national volleyball team from 1985 to 1988 and helped secure a gold medal at the 1988 Summer Olympics in Seoul, South Korea as a setter. His jersey number was 9. Luyties was on the team as a backup setter but took over for Jeff Stork after his injury. The Olympic team was undefeated in seven matches and was also included three other UCLA alumni: Karch Kiraly, Steve Salmons, and Dave Saunders.

He was also a member of the 1983 U.S. National Team who won gold in the Pan American Games .

Beach volleyball career

Luyties played in his first beach tournament at Hermosa Beach, California in July 1983 with Steve Obradovich. Luyties obtained his first win in July 1988 at the AVP tour in Manhattan Beach, California with his partner, Karch Kiraly. In 1991, Luyties tallied 4 wins on the AVP tour. One was with partner, Mike Dodd and the other three were with his partner, Adam Johnson. Luyties had two wins with his partner, Brent Frohoff in 1992 and 1994 at the AVP tour. Throughout his professional beach volleyball career Luyties totaled 7 domestic titles.

Coaching career

Luyties was the head coach at La Jolla High School in 1999 and 2000. He was also the coach of the Coast Volleyball Club Girls 16’s team, the Wind ‘N Sea Volleyball Club, the San Diego Volleyball Club Boys 17’s and Girls 15’s and 16’s teams.

Luyties began his college-coaching career as an assistant at the University of Colorado. He coached there for three seasons and reached the NCAA Tournament twice.  He spent six seasons coaching at Southern Mississippi with an overall record of 85 wins and 96 losses. His last season at Southern Mississippi was his most successful with an overall record of 27-5, obtaining the Golden Eagles first league title. Due to his coaching performance Luyties earned Conference USA Coach of the Year honors.

Luyties took over the head coach position at UC San Diego in 2010  and will be returning to coach the San Diego Volleyball Club Girls 18-1’s team for his second consecutive year.

Personal
Luyties graduated from UCLA in 1985 with a bachelor's degree in Economics.

He met his wife, Lorie, at a beach volleyball tournament. They currently live in San Diego, California with their two daughters, Chloe and Lia.

References

1962 births
Living people
American men's volleyball players
American men's beach volleyball players
Volleyball players at the 1988 Summer Olympics
Olympic gold medalists for the United States in volleyball
Medalists at the 1988 Summer Olympics
Sportspeople from California
UCLA Bruins men's volleyball players
Goodwill Games medalists in volleyball
Competitors at the 1986 Goodwill Games
American volleyball coaches
Pan American Games medalists in volleyball
Pan American Games gold medalists for the United States
Medalists at the 1987 Pan American Games